The Black Horse Bandit is a 1919 American short silent Western film directed by Harry Harvey and featuring Hoot Gibson.

Cast
 Hoot Gibson
 Helen Gibson
 Pete Morrison
 Vester Pegg
 Buck Connors

See also
 List of American films of 1919
 Hoot Gibson filmography

External links
 

1919 films
1919 Western (genre) films
1919 short films
American black-and-white films
American silent short films
Silent American Western (genre) films
1910s American films
1910s English-language films